Sampara is a village and seat of the commune of Bassirou in the Cercle of Mopti in the Mopti Region of southern-central Mali. The village is 20 km north of Sévaré between the RN15 and the Niger River.

sampara village also founded in andhra pradesh east godavari dist.

References

Populated places in Mopti Region